The 2018 Taça Nacional da Guiné Bissau is the 34th edition of the Taça Nacional da Guiné Bissau since independence, the knockout football competition of Guinea-Bissau.

First round
[Feb 27]

Portos de Bissau	0-1 Benfica de Bissau

Académica de Ingoré	0-1 Sporting de Bafatá

Djata FC (Fulacunda)	awd Os Arados FC (Nhacra)	[3-0 awarded; Os Arados FC (Nhacra) dns]

Massaf de Cacine	awd Flamengo FC de Pefine	[3-0 awarded; Flamengo FC de Pefine dns]

Lagartos de Bambadinca	awd Atlético de Bissorã		[3-0 awarded; Atlético de Bissorã dns]

Desportivo de Farim	awd Quínara FC (Tite)		[3-0 awarded; Quínara FC (Tite) dns]

CDR Gabú		3-1 ADR Mansabá

Sporting Guiné-Bissau   drw Os Balantas de Mansôa	[7-6 pen]

FC Cumura		0-1 UDIB

FC Canchungo		2-3 Nuno Tristão de Bula

Estrela Negra Bolama	1-4 Tigres de Fronteira

[Mar 13]

FC Cuntum		3-1 Vitória FC (Cacheu)

[Mar 14]

GDR Quelelé		3-4 FC Pelundo

Second round
[Mar 28]

UDIB			4-1 Nuno Tristão de Bula

FC Cuntum		drw Sporting Guiné-Bissau	[4-3 pen]

FC Pelundo		2-1 Lagartos de Bambadinca

Djata FC (Fulacunda)	3-4 Massaf de Cacine

Desportivo de Farim	0-2 CDR Gabú

[Mar 29]

Benfica de Bissau	2-1 Sporting de Bafatá

Tigres de Fronteira	bye

Third round
[May 23]

Benfica de Bissau	2-1 Massaf de Cacine

FC Pelundo		3-0 CDR Gabú

[May 24]

UDIB			3-1 Tigres de Fronteira

FC Cuntum		bye

Semi-finals
[Jun 9]

Benfica de Bissau	2-2 FC Pelundo			[4-2 pen]

[Jun 10]

FC Cuntum		2-0 UDIB

Final
[Jun 23]

Benfica de Bissau	2-1 FC Cuntum			[aet]

See also
2017–18 Campeonato Nacional da Guiné-Bissau

References

Guinea-Bissau
Cup
Football competitions in Guinea-Bissau